TSR2 may refer to:

 the TSR2 (gene), a human gene encoding a protein involved in ribosome biogenesis
 the BAC TSR-2, British Aircraft Corporation Tactical Strike/Reconnaissance 2
 the former name of RTS Deux, a public television channel in Switzerland owned by Radio Télévision Suisse